Mapsidius chenopodii is a moth of the family Scythrididae. It was first described by Otto Herman Swezey in 1947. It is endemic to the island of Hawaii.

The larvae feed on Chenopodium oahuense.

References

External links

Scythrididae
Endemic moths of Hawaii